This is a list of Australian Federal Police officers killed in the line of duty (excluding by suicide).Australian Federal Police personnel killed in the line of duty (excluding by suicide).

List
Notes

References

See also
List of American police officers killed in the line of duty
List of Irish police officers killed in the line of duty
National Police Memorial Australia

 External links 
 National Police Memorial - Honour Roll

Police officers
 
Australian police officers
Lists of police officers killed in the line of duty
Federal Police killed in the line of duty
Police